Jack Combs (born January 26, 1988) is an American professional ice hockey forward who is currently playing for the Allen Americans of the ECHL.

Playing career
Prior to turning professional, Combs played for the California Wave Midget team for one season and for five seasons with the Kitchener Rangers and Saginaw Spirit of the Ontario Hockey League.  Combs attended the training camp of the Colorado Avalanche of the National Hockey League in 2008 before he signed with the Alaska Aces for his first professional season in 2009–10.  After 11 games with the Aces, Combs was traded to the Trenton Devils of the ECHL.  On April 5, 2010, Combs signed a Professional Try Out contract with the Peoria Rivermen of the American Hockey League  For his second season, Combs signed with the Tulsa Oilers of the Central Hockey League, an affiliate of the Colorado Avalanche.  Establishing a formidable partnership alongside linemate Chad Costello, Costello and Combs ranked 9th and 10th, respectively, in total points (84 and 82) in the league in 2010-11.

On August 18, 2011, Combs, alongside his Tulsa linemate Costello, signed with the Colorado Eagles of the ECHL.  After combining with Costello to lead the league in scoring after 23 games with 37 points in the 2011–12 season, Combs signed mid-season with the Worcester Sharks of the American Hockey League.

Combs returned to the Eagles the following season and scored 42 points (19 goals and 23 assists) in 27 games.  His partnership with Costello was signified when they both were signed to Professional Try Out contract with the Bridgeport Sound Tigers of the American Hockey League on December 18, 2012.  On January 9, 2013, Combs and Costello were both signed by the Sound Tigers to Standard Player Contracts for the remainder of the 2012–13 season.  Combs played in 22 games with the Sound Tigers for 14 points (5 goals and 9 assists) before he was traded to the San Antonio Rampage in exchange for future considerations on March 14, 2013.

After starting the 2013-14 season playing 19 games for the Rampage and 8 games for the Cincinnati Cyclones, the Rampage's ECHL affiliate, the Rampage traded Combs to the Oklahoma City Barons in exchange for Derek Nesbitt.

For the 2014-15 season, Combs signed with the Russian club Toros Neftekamsk of the Supreme Hockey League (VHL).  After only 11 games, Combs opted to leave Toros Neftekamsk and return to North America.  On October 21, 2014, Combs signed a contract with the Allen Americans of the ECHL to re-unite with Chad Costello.  Though he was leading the ECHL at the time in scoring for the 2014-15 season with 56 points, Combs signed with the Swedish club IF Björklöven of HockeyAllsvenskan in January 2015.  In light of Combs' departure, the Americans waived him on February 14, 2015.  Due to his desire for more ice time than the team could offer and to rejoin the Allen Americans, Combs was released by IF Björklöven on February 14, 2015 after playing only three games.  Combs' attempt to rejoin the Americans was stifled when his ECHL rights were claimed off of waivers by the Stockton Thunder on February 15, 2015.

Combs reported to the Thunder and played 11 games for the team, accumulating 5 goals and 8 assists.  With the Thunder out of playoff contention, Thunder Head Coach Rich Kromm fulfilled a promise made to Combs and placed him on waivers on March 17, 2015 to try to help Combs re-join the Americans.

Combs' attempt to return to the Americans was again stifled when his ECHL rights were claimed off of waivers by the Missouri Mavericks.  Before playing a game for the Mavericks, Combs was released by the team on March 24, 2015, which again placed Combs' ECHL rights on waivers.  On March 25, 2015, Combs' ECHL rights were claimed off of waivers by the Cincinnati Cyclones, to which he did report, playing his first game for the team on March 27, 2015.

On September 16, 2015, Combs earned an AHL contract, agreeing to a one-year deal with the Hartford Wolf Pack. After attending the Wolf Pack training camp, he was assigned to ECHL affiliate, the Greenville Swamp Rabbits to begin the 2015–16 season. In splitting the year between the two club, Combs appeared in 18 games for the Wolf Pack with 2 goals and 4 points.

On July 11, 2016, Combs embarked on another European contract, agreeing to a one-year deal with newly promoted DEL club, Fischtown Pinguins. He scored 27 goals in 51 contests in the 2016-17 regular season, which made him the league's leading goal-scorer that year. Combs left Bremerhaven after the 2016-17 season and signed with fellow DEL side Iserlohn Roosters in May 2017.

On October 24, 2019, Combs returned to playing hockey in North America by signing with the Wichita Thunder of the ECHL.

Following two further European seasons, on October 15, 2021, Combs opted to return to North American and join former club, the Allen Americans of the ECHL, on a one-year deal.

Career statistics

References

External links

1988 births
Living people
Alaska Aces (ECHL) players
Allen Americans players
American men's ice hockey right wingers
Bridgeport Sound Tigers players
Chicago Wolves players
Colorado Eagles players
Cincinnati Cyclones (ECHL) players
Fischtown Pinguins players
Greenville Swamp Rabbits players
Hartford Wolf Pack players
Ice hockey people from St. Louis
IF Björklöven players
Iserlohn Roosters players
Kitchener Rangers players
EHC Kloten players
Oklahoma City Barons players
Peoria Rivermen (AHL) players
Rote Teufel Bad Nauheim players
Saginaw Spirit players
San Antonio Rampage players
HSC Csíkszereda players
Stockton Thunder players
Trenton Devils players
Tulsa Oilers (1992–present) players
Worcester Sharks players
Wichita Thunder players
Competitors at the 2022 World Games
World Games gold medalists
American expatriate ice hockey players in Russia
American expatriate ice hockey players in Romania
American expatriate ice hockey players in Sweden
American expatriate ice hockey players in Switzerland
American expatriate ice hockey players in Germany
American expatriate ice hockey players in Canada